Reginald Richter (17 October 1914 – 10 July 1965) was a South African cricketer. He played in twelve first-class matches from 1933/34 to 1948/49.

References

External links
 

1914 births
1965 deaths
South African cricketers
Border cricketers
Eastern Province cricketers
Griqualand West cricketers